RISE is a democratic socialist political organisation in Ireland, founded in September 2019 by former members of the Socialist Party, including Paul Murphy TD. While it was established as a separate political group, it was never officially registered as a political party. Instead, in February 2021 it entered People Before Profit party as an internal network. The name is a contrived acronym standing for Revolutionary, Internationalist, Socialist and Environmentalist. It supports a Socialist Green New Deal to reach net zero carbon emissions by 2030, the nationalisation and democratic control of the banking system and the abolition of capitalist private property.

The organisation runs a weekly podcast called Rupture Radio, and also launched a eco-socialist quarterly publication, Rupture, in July 2020.

Elections
After RISE's foundation, it was not a registered political party and instead formed part of the Solidarity–People Before Profit alliance for electoral purposes. RISE contested an election for the first time at the 2020 general election, in which it ran as part of the Solidarity–People Before Profit alliance. Paul Murphy, one of the network's founders and a TD for Dublin South-West, was RISE's only candidate in this election and was reelected.

General elections

References

External links

2019 establishments in Ireland
Political parties established in 2019
2021 establishments in Ireland
Political parties disestablished in 2021
Ecosocialist parties
Environmentalism in the Republic of Ireland
Left-wing politics in Ireland
Socialist parties in Ireland
Defunct political parties in the Republic of Ireland
Trotskyist organisations in Ireland